Hemianthus micranthemoides, also known as Micranthemum micranthemoides, pearl grass and pearl weed,  is a popular aquatic plant most commonly used in aquascaping. It is very similar to H. callitrichoides, but has somewhat larger leaves. It belongs to the group of aquarium plants commonly known as "pearl weed".

Distribution
Hemianthus micranthemoides is native to the mid-atlantic region of the United States. It is believed to be extinct in its native range.

In the aquarium 
Hemianthus micranthemoides is a very popular aquarium plant.

References

Scrophulariaceae
Aquatic plants
Plants described in 1817